25CN-NBOMe (2C-CN-NBOMe, NBOMe-2C-CN) is a derivative of the phenethylamine 2C-CN. It acts in a similar manner to related compounds such as 25I-NBOMe, which are potent agonists at the 5HT2A receptor.

Legality

United Kingdom

See also 
 25I-NBOMe (NBOMe-2C-I)
 25B-NBOMe (NBOMe-2C-B)
 25C-NBOMe (NBOMe-2C-C)
 2C-TFM-NBOMe (NBOMe-2C-TFM)
 25CN-NBOH (NBOH-2C-CN)

References 

25-NB (psychedelics)